The 2018–19 CAF Champions League (officially the 2018–19 Total CAF Champions League for sponsorship reasons) was the 55th edition of Africa's premier club football tournament organized by the Confederation of African Football (CAF), and the 23rd edition under the current CAF Champions League title.

This season followed a transitional calendar which allows the CAF club competitions to switch from a February-to-November schedule to an August–to-May schedule, as per the decision of the CAF Executive Committee on 20 July 2017. It began in December 2018, right after the 2018 season had finished, and ended in May 2019, before the 2019 Africa Cup of Nations (which had been switched from a January/February to a June/July date). The next season then started after the Africa Cup of Nations and followed the new calendar.

Defending champions Espérance de Tunis won a second consecutive title, being declared the winners after their second leg match against Wydad AC in the final was abandoned.

As winners of the 2018–19 CAF Champions League, Espérance de Tunis qualified for the 2019 FIFA Club World Cup in Qatar, and earned the right to play against the winners of the 2018–19 CAF Confederation Cup, Zamalek, in the 2020 CAF Super Cup.

Association team allocation
All 56 CAF member associations may enter the CAF Champions League, with the 12 highest ranked associations according to their CAF 5-Year Ranking eligible to enter two teams in the competition. As a result, theoretically a maximum of 68 teams could enter the tournament – although this level has never been reached.

For the 2018–19 CAF Champions League, the CAF uses the 2013–2017 CAF 5-Year Ranking, which calculates points for each entrant association based on their clubs’ performance over those 5 years in the CAF Champions League and CAF Confederation Cup. The criteria for points are the following:

The points are multiplied by a coefficient according to the year as follows:
2017 – 5
2016 – 4
2015 – 3
2014 – 2
2013 – 1

Teams
The following 57 teams from 46 associations entered the competition.
For this season, the title holders (in bold italics) receive a bye to the group stage.
Four teams (in bold) received a bye to the first round.
The other 52 teams entered the preliminary round.

Associations are shown according to their 2013–2017 CAF 5-Year Ranking – those with a ranking score have their rank and score indicated.

Notes

Associations which did not enter a team

Schedule
The schedule of the competition was as follows (matches scheduled in midweek in italics). Effective from the Champions League group stage, weekend matches were played on Fridays and Saturdays while midweek matches were played on Tuesdays, with some exceptions. Kick-off times were also fixed at 13:00 (Saturdays and Tuesdays only), 16:00 and 19:00 GMT.

Qualifying rounds

Preliminary round

First round

Group stage

In the group stage, each group was played on a home-and-away round-robin basis. The winners and runners-up of each group advanced to the quarter-finals of the knockout stage.

Group A

Group B

Group C

Group D

Knockout stage

Bracket

Quarter-finals

Semi-finals

Final

Top goalscorers

See also
2018–19 CAF Confederation Cup
2020 CAF Super Cup

References

References

External links
Total CAF Champions League 2018/2019, CAFonline.com

2018–19
 
1
1